Gaertnera longifolia is a species of plant in the family Rubiaceae. It is endemic to Mauritius.  Its natural habitat is subtropical or tropical dry forests. It is threatened by habitat loss.

References

longifolia
Endemic flora of Mauritius
Critically endangered plants
Taxonomy articles created by Polbot
Taxa named by Wenceslas Bojer